This is a list of episodes from the second season of Shark Tank.

Episodes

Daymond John, Kevin O'Leary, Barbara Corcoran, and Robert Herjavec appear as the sharks in every episode this season.

References

External links 
 Official website
 

2
2011 American television seasons